Hanover County Public Schools is a school division headquartered in Ashland, Virginia. It serves approximately 17,000 students across 26 schools in Hanover County, including 15 elementary, four middle, and four high schools, one trade and technology center, one K–12 online school, and one alternative education school.

Schools

Schools in the Hanover County Public Schools division:

Elementary Schools:
 Battlefield Park Elementary School
 Beaverdam Elementary School
 Cold Harbor Elementary School
 Cool Spring Elementary School
 Elmont Elementary School
 Henry Clay Elementary School
 John M. Gandy Elementary School
 Kersey Creek Elementary School
 Laurel Meadow Elementary School
 Mechanicsville Elementary School
 Pearson's Corner Elementary School
 Pole Green Elementary School
 Rural Point Elementary School
 South Anna Elementary School
 Washington-Henry Elementary School

Middle Schools:
 Chickahominy Middle School
 Liberty Middle School
 Oak Knoll Middle School
 Bell Creek Middle School

High schools:
 Atlee High School (Mechanicsville)
 Hanover High School (Mechanicsville)
 Patrick Henry High School (Ashland)
 Mechanicsville High School (Mechanicsville)

Alternative schools:
 The Georgetown School (Mechanicsville)
 The Hanover Center for Trades & Technology (Mechanicsville)
Hanover County Online School

References

External links
 Hanover County Public Schools
School divisions in Virginia
Education in Hanover County, Virginia